The Federal Detention Center, Honolulu (FDC Honolulu) is a United States federal prison facility in Hawaii which holds male and female prisoners of all security levels prior to or during court proceedings in Hawaii Federal District Court, as well as inmates serving brief sentences. It is operated by the Federal Bureau of Prisons, a division of the United States Department of Justice.

FDC Honolulu is located adjacent to Daniel K. Inouye International Airport, and is at the airport's western perimeter. The building has twelve stories.

As of 2013 it houses 300 prisoners sentenced under Hawaii state law rather than federal law; the Hawaii state prison system did not have enough capacity for these prisoners.

History
The facility opened in 2001. The first 25 inmates to occupy the facility were scheduled to arrive at FDC Honolulu on July 31 of that year; previously they were held in facilities in the Mainland United States. The first five groups, each consisting of 25 inmates, were made up of inmates within their final two years of their federal prison sentences. FDC Honolulu relieved the Oahu Community Correctional Center, operated by the Hawaii Department of Public Safety. As of June 2001, the Oahu Community Correctional Center, designed to hold 1,000 pretrial inmates, held 1,150 pretrial inmates. The first pretrial inmates from Hawaii were scheduled to move into the federal center one month after the first five groups of 25 convicted inmates had arrived.

As of 2016 the Hawaii State Legislature has expressed an interest in acquiring FDC Honolulu.

Notable inmates (current and former)

See also

List of U.S. federal prisons
Federal Bureau of Prisons
Incarceration in the United States

References

External links

FDC Honolulu Official site

Buildings and structures in Honolulu
Honolulu
Prisons in Hawaii
2001 establishments in Hawaii